Nebojša Grahovac (born 11 February 1984) is a Bosnian handball player for C' Chartres MHB and the Bosnia and Herzegovina national team.

He previously played for RK Prijedor, Borac Banja Luka, Bosna Sarajevo and Chambéry.

References

External links

1984 births
Living people
Bosnia and Herzegovina male handball players
People from Prijedor
RK Borac Banja Luka players
Expatriate handball players
Bosnia and Herzegovina expatriate sportspeople in France
Mediterranean Games competitors for Bosnia and Herzegovina
Competitors at the 2009 Mediterranean Games
Serbs of Bosnia and Herzegovina